This is an article about qualification for the 2017 Boys' Youth European Volleyball Championship.

Qualification summary

Pool standing procedure
 Number of matches won
 Match points
 Sets ratio
 Points ratio
 Result of the last match between the tied teams

Match won 3–0 or 3–1: 3 match points for the winner, 0 match points for the loser
Match won 3–2: 2 match points for the winner, 1 match point for the loser

Direct qualification

Qualification
The winners of each pools and the two second placed teams qualified for final round. Because Pool H has only three teams. The second placed teams will cut the result which they play with the fourth ranked teams before consider the qualified teams.
Pools composition

Pool A

|}

|}

Pool B

|}

|}

Pool C

|}

|}

Pool D

|}

|}

Pool E

|}

|}

Pool F

|}

|}

Pool G

|}

|}

Pool H

|}

|}

Ranking of the second placed teams
There was a pool which competed with three teams while the others had four teams. So, the result of fourth placed teams of each pools would be cut off before consider the qualified teams.

|}

References

External links
Official website

Boys' Youth European Volleyball Championship
European Championship U17